was a Japanese samurai of the late Edo period. A retainer of the Niwa clan of Nihonmatsu han, Kuroda fought in the Boshin War, seeing action at the Battle of Bonari Pass. Met the famous Saitō Hajime in a nearby valley following the Imperial Japanese Army's victory.

Resource
Tōdō Toshihisa, "Saitō Hajime Kanren Jinbutsu Jiten". pp. 193–206 of Shinsengumi Saitō Hajime no Subete. Tōkyō: Shin Jinbutsu Ōraisha, 2003, p. 195.

1843 births
1908 deaths
Samurai
Meiji Restoration